The 2020–21 Marquette Golden Eagles men's basketball team represented Marquette University during the 2020–21 NCAA Division I men's basketball season. The team was led by seventh-year head coach Steve Wojciechowski, and played their home games at Fiserv Forum in Milwaukee, Wisconsin as a member of the Big East Conference. They finished the season 13–14, 8–11 in Big East play to finish in ninth place. They lost in the first round of the Big East tournament to Georgetown.

On March 19, 2021, the school fired head coach Steve Wojciechowski. A week later, the school named Texas head coach Shaka Smart the team's new head coach.

Previous season 
The Golden Eagles finished the 2019–20 season 18–12, 8–10 in Big East play to finish in a tie for sixth place. The Big East tournament and all other postseason tournaments were canceled due to the ongoing COVID-19 pandemic.

Roster

Schedule and results

|-
!colspan=12 style=|Regular season

|-
!colspan=9 style=|Big East tournament

Source

References

Marquette Golden Eagles men's basketball seasons
Marquette Golden Eagles
Marquette Golden Eagles men's basketball
Marquette Golden Eagles men's basketball